Kinsale RFC is a rugby union team located in the town of Kinsale, Co. Cork, Ireland - approximately 18 miles from Cork City. Founded in 1982, the club's 1st team competes in Division 2 of the Munster Junior League. Kinsale also fields various other teams including Ladies, Veterans, and have underage teams from U-8 up to U-18. 
Kinsale RFC is also home to Europe's largest Rugby Sevens event, The Heineken Kinsale Sevens, which is held at its Snugmore grounds every May.

Notable former players 
Darragh Hurley
Denis O' Dowd
Billy Hayes

Honours 
1982 - 1983 - Tait Cup, Minor League
1983 - 1984 - Minor B League, McCarthy Cup
1984 - 1985 - McCarthy Cup, Pfizer 7.s
1985 - 1986 - Kelly Cup, McCarthy Cup, Minor B Cup
1987 - 1988 - J4 Cup, Tait Cup
1988 - 1989 - Kelly Cup
1990 - 1991 - Ballincollig 7's
1991 - 1992 - Kelly Cup
1992 - 1993 - J4 Cup
1995 - 1996 - Promotion to Junior Status, Kelly Cup, J2 League
2000 - 2001 - Munster Junior League Div3
2002 - 2003 - U18 and U14 Cups

Kinsale Sevens 

Kinsale RFC is also the proud hosts of the annual Kinsale Sevens rugby tournament (also known as Heineken Kinsale Sevens, Kinsale Sevens By The Sea) - Ireland and Europe's premier seven-a-side club rugby event. The event takes place across the May Bank Holiday Weekend and witnesses teams from around the world compete against each other in ladies, men's (junior and senior) and veteran competitions.

References

External links 
 Official site
 Kinsale Sevens

Irish rugby union teams
Rugby clubs established in 1982
Rugby union clubs in County Cork
Sport in Kinsale
1982 establishments in Ireland